In the United States, Tax Day is the day on which individual income tax returns are due to be submitted to the federal government. Since 1955, Tax Day has typically fallen on or just after April 15. Tax Day was first introduced in 1913, when the Sixteenth Amendment was ratified.

The date is delayed if it conflicts with a weekend or public holiday such as Emancipation Day. Natural disasters or public health emergencies, most recently the COVID-19 pandemic, also delay Tax Day when they prevent filing taxes on time, and state income agencies often delay their own submission deadlines to remain in common with that of the federal government. The federal government may set a different deadline for certain states, as it did when Patriots' Day conflicted.

History
Federal income tax was briefly introduced with the Revenue Act of 1861 to help fund the Civil War, and subsequently repealed, re-adopted, and held unconstitutional. The early taxes were based on assessments, not voluntary tax returns. Tax payment dates varied by act.

The case of Pollock v. Farmers' Loan & Trust Co. challenged the constitutionality of the Wilson–Gorman Tariff Act of 1894, which taxed incomes over $4,000 at the rate of two percent. The case was decided by the United States Supreme Court in 1895. The Supreme Court decided that the Act's unapportioned income taxes on interest, dividends, and rents were effectively direct taxes. The Act was therefore unconstitutional because it violated the Constitution's rule that direct taxes be apportioned among the states. In 1913, eighteen years later, the Sixteenth Amendment to the United States Constitution was ratified. This Amendment gave the United States Congress the legal authority to tax all incomes without regard to the apportionment requirement.

The filing deadline for individuals was March 1 in 1913 (the first year of a federal income tax), and was changed to March 15 in 1918 and again to April 15 in 1955. Today, the deadline remains April 15, unless it conflicts with on a weekend or a holiday.

Alignment with state and District of Columbia holidays and changes in date

Tax Day occasionally falls on Patriots' Day, a civic holiday in the Commonwealth of Massachusetts and state of Maine, or the preceding weekend. When this occurred for some time, the federal tax deadline was extended by a day for the residents of Maine, Maryland, Massachusetts, New Hampshire, New York, Vermont, and the District of Columbia, because the IRS processing center for these areas was located in Andover, Massachusetts and the unionized IRS employees got the day off. In 2011 and 2015, Tax Day fell on Patriots' Day. However, federal filings were directed to Hartford, Connecticut, Charlotte, North Carolina and Kansas City, Missouri, and there was no further extension for Maine, Massachusetts or other surrounding states' residents. In 2019 and 2021, when Patriots Day was again observed on the tax filing deadline, residents of Maine and Massachusetts were given extra time to file as post offices in those states would be closed on normal deadline.

Emancipation Day is celebrated in Washington, D.C. on the weekday nearest April 16, and under a federal statute enacted decades ago, holidays observed in the District of Columbia have an impact nationwide.  If April 15 falls on a Friday then Emancipation Day is celebrated on the same day and tax returns are instead due the following Monday, April 18. When April 15 falls on a Saturday or Sunday then Emancipation Day is celebrated on the following Monday and tax returns are instead due on Tuesday.

For both Emancipation Day and Patriots' Day, when April 15 falls on a Saturday or Sunday, tax returns are due the following Tuesday, April 18 or April 17 respectively. This means that when the tax filing deadline is not moved for other political reasons, tax day for any particular year is always on April 15 (years when this day is a Monday through Thursday), Tuesday April 17 (years when April 15 is a Sunday) or Monday or Tuesday April 18 (years when April 15 is either a Friday or Saturday). For residents of Maine and Massachusetts, tax day may fall on April 19th if the 15th was Emancipation Day and the 18th is Patriots Day.

In 2007 a powerful storm and flooding affected the East Coast, and certain states were granted additional time to file. In some cases, the deadline was extended to as late as June 25.

In 2020, due to the economic effects of the coronavirus pandemic filing for returns was extended to July 15. The tax deadline was again moved in 2021 due to tax code changes from the COVID-19 relief package from April 15 to May 17, 2021.

See also
 Jackie Robinson Day
 Tax Freedom Day

References

External links
 "Tax Day April 15, 1913" at AmericasLibrary.gov 
 Tax Return deadlines at eFile.com (IRS electronic filing site) 

April observances
Taxation in the United States